Joshua Moore may refer to:
 Joshua John Moore (1790–1864), grazier and landowner in Australia
 Joshua Moore (American football) (born 1988), American football cornerback
 Josh A. Moore (born 1980), American basketball player and actor
 Josh Moore (politician) (born 1989), member of the New Hampshire House of Representatives